Dřevěnice is a municipality and village in Jičín District in the Hradec Králové Region of the Czech Republic. It has about 300 inhabitants.

Administrative parts
The village of Dolánky is an administrative part of Dřevěnice.

Notable people
Zbyněk Berka of Dubá (1551–1606), Archbishop of Prague

References

Villages in Jičín District